Robert Adair may refer to:

 Robert Adair (of Hollybrook) (died 1737), Irish MP for Philipstown (Parliament of Ireland constituency) and protagonist in one version of the song "Robin Adair"
 Robert Adair (surgeon) (died 1790), English surgeon, Inspector-General of the Hospitals and surgeon of the Royal Hospital, Chelsea, father of Robert Adair (politician)
 Sir Robert Adair (politician) (1763–1855), British diplomat, son of the surgeon
 Robert Adair, 1st Baron Waveney (1811–1886), English politician, MP for Cambridge 1847–1852 and 1854–1857
 Robert Adair (cricketer) (1876–1951), Irish cricketer
 Robert Adair (actor) (1900–1954), American actor
 Robert Adair (physicist) (1924–2020), American physicist

See also 
Robert Ader (1932–2011), American psychologist who co-founded psychoneuroimmunology